Tom Kundig (born 1954) is an American architect and principal in the Seattle-based firm Olson Kundig Architects. He has won numerous professional honors.

In 2015, Princeton Architectural Press released Tom Kundig: Works, a collection of Kundig's recent projects, including commercial spaces and public buildings.  In 2011, Princeton Architectural Press released Tom Kundig: Houses 2, the follow up to the 2006 book, Tom Kundig: Houses, one of the Press’s bestselling architecture books of all time. Kundig has been published over 450 times in publications worldwide, including the Financial Times, The Wall Street Journal, Architectural Record, Dwell, Architectural Digest and The New York Times. Kundig’s undergraduate and graduate architecture degrees are from the University of Washington.

Early life and career
Tom Kundig was born on October 9, 1954 in Merced, California and raised in Spokane, Washington. As a teenager, he found early influences in his work at sawmills, his surroundings and his time spent hiking, skiing and climbing. "I experienced being relatively humble in the landscape," Kundig says about his childhood. "Mountaineering and architecture have many parallels—they're about solving the problem in as clear and economic means as possible—it's not about getting to the top." He also took inspiration from the sculptor Harold Balazs, who taught him that building a project is the most important part of the design process as well as how tough it is to be an artist.

In college, Kundig originally trained as a geophysicist before switching to architecture, his father's profession. In an interview with the National Building Museum, he says:
When I left for college, I was more interested in the hard sciences—physics and especially geophysics. I was fascinated by the movement of Earth tectonics and geology. The idea of these large forces that shape our Earth is still a really fascinating sidebar interest. In fact, I’d almost say it is a focus; I’m often as interested in that as I am in architecture. Ultimately, I came to understand pretty early that I did not have a natural propensity for the larger geophysics requirements and I really missed what architecture is: the intersection between the rational and the poetic. I was just in the rational world of physics and I missed the poetic. Architecture lets me have both.

After working for other firms around the world, Kundig joined Olson Kundig Architects in 1986. He first came to national attention with Studio House, a private residence that he completed in 1998. In 2002, he completed Chicken Point Cabin, a private residence that remains one of his most "iconic and poetic" designs that includes one of his most recognized gizmos: a 20-foot by 30-foot window-wall that opens with a hand crank.

Kundig regularly serves on design juries and lectures around the world on architecture and design. He has been a university studio critic throughout the United States and in Japan, including at Harvard University and the University of Oregon, and has served as the John G. Williams Distinguished Professor at the University of Arkansas School of Architecture and the D. Kenneth Sargent Visiting Design Critic at Syracuse University’s College of Architecture. Recent lectures include presentations at the Royal Academy of Arts in London and the New York Public Library. His award-winning work has been exhibited at the American Academy of Arts and Letters in New York City, Syracuse University, and at the National Building Museum in Washington, D.C. In the winter of 2010/2011, he was the sole North American architect chosen to represent the continent in an exhibit at TOTO GALLERY MA in Tokyo, Japan.

Quotes
Asked about the origins of Kundig’s interest in gizmos: “When I was a kid, I grew up amongst industry: mining, logging, farming. Naturally, with that there was a lot of machinery, a lot of practically-designed – and in its way, beautiful – machinery. And when I lived in Alaska, I would go way out in the country, hiking and mountain climbing, and I would see these pieces of machinery way the heck back there, powered by wind or by water coming off the side of a mountain. The guys who designed these were geniuses! As I was developing an architectural voice, I realized there was something similar about buildings that I found fascinating: that buildings could be changed by people using them. You can literally move walls or furniture and move it on a scale that reminds you that, in fact, you’re capable –with geometry and physics– of moving these things.”

On the importance of detail: “Detail is important because it’s at that lever that you interact directly with the building. You touch, move, and handle detail at the most intimate levels. I think If you can’t walk into a house and smile about something, there’s something missing in that house. I want the people I build houses for to love their house to death, and hopefully to call me two or three years later and say the place is just getting better and better. It’s what I do this stuff for: to be involved with a landscape and with these personalities.”

On the influence of artist Harold Balazs: “Sometimes you just luck out in life and you meet a force of nature. I benefited tremendously from my family’s friendship with sculptor Harold Balazs. A sculptor and humanitarian, Harold instilled in my youth a sense of courage and enthusiasm to embrace this lucky moment we have on earth. As a kid I watched fantastic sculptures being fabricated at his shop and home in Mead, Washington. I witnessed his experiments and ideas with different medium and materials and how all of it related to the culture and politics of our time. He said to me out of the blue: ‘If you want to see what art can be, look at hot rods.’ This was around 1968. The point he was making was they were challenging the status quo and re-inventing the commodities with their own ideas and craft. He saw their craft as an incredible source of inspiration for his work, and that left a lasting impression.”

"One is tempted to label Kundig's architecture as an example of Northwestern regionalism, yet his houses built in other geographical and climatic settings respond appropriately to these different conditions."

"I believe Tom's success is grounded in the relaxedness and centeredness of one that devoutly performs a strong and personal vocation, which allows him to master the personas that he chooses to present. Rejecting the self-indulgent, Tom doesn't shy away from the profession's extremes of making a personal work dedicating his efforts to his clients."

"Tom's larger contributions should also be acknowledged; his public works of architecture will bring inspired spaces with intense connections of material and detail to the joy of a greater number of individuals in the future. His positive mental thoughts, his core values, perhaps these are the conception of a 'spirit of architecture', which is passed on and thrives in continuity and zeal."

Recognition and awards
Kundig is recipient of numerous awards and honors including the prestigious National Design Award in Architecture Design from the Smithsonian Cooper-Hewitt National Design Museum (2008). Kundig was elected to the American Academy of Arts and Letters in 2007. 14 projects by Kundig have been recognized by The American Institute of Architects National Awards, including the AIA Honor Awards for Art Stable (2013), Outpost (2010) and Delta Shelter (2008). The AIA has also awarded Kundig's project with AIA Northwest & Pacific Region Honor Award for The Rolling Huts (2009), Montecito Residence (2008) and Delta Shelter (2007). Other awards and distinctions include several American Architecture Awards from the Chicago Athenaeum for Outpost (2009), The Rolling Huts (2009), Montecito Residence (2008), Delta Shelter (2007) and Tye River Cabin (2007). Also, Kundig was named the Architectural League of New York's, Emerging Architect in 2004.

 AIA National Honor Awards, Architecture, Art Stable, 2013
 AIA National Honor Awards, Interior Architecture, Charles Smith Wines, 2013
 AIA Northwest & Pacific Region Honor Award, The Pierre, 2012
 Builder's Choice Design & Planning Awards, Builder's Choice Grand Award, The Pierre, 2012
 IIDA Northern Pacific Chapter INawards, People's Choice Award, Charles Smith Wines, 2012
 American Architecture Award, Chicago Athenaeum, Studio Sitges, 2012
 European Centre and Chicago Athenaeum International Architecture Award, Art Stable, 2012
 AIA National Housing Award, The Pierre, 2012
 AIA Northwest & Pacific Region Honor Award, Art Stable, 2011
 AIA National Housing Award, Art Stable, 2011
 AIA National Housing Award, 1111 E. Pike, 2011
 AIA National Honor Award, Outpost, 2010
 AIA National Housing Committee Award, Montecito Residence, 2009
 AIA National Housing Committee Award, Outpost, 2009
 AIA Northwest & Pacific Region Honor Award, The Rolling Huts, 2009
 American Architecture Award, Chicago Athenaeum, Outpost, 2009
 American Architecture Award, Chicago Athenaeum, The Rolling Huts, 2009
 National Design Award in Architecture Design, Smithsonian Cooper-Hewitt National Design Museum, 2008
 AIA National Honor Award, Delta Shelter, 2008
 American Architecture Award, Chicago Athenaeum, Montecito Residence, 2008
 AIA Northwest & Pacific Region Honor Award, Montecito Residence, 2008
 American Academy of Arts & Letters, Academy Award in Architecture, 2007
 AIA National Housing Committee Award, Delta Shelter, 2007
 AIA National Housing Committee Award, Tye River Cabin, 2007
 AIA Northwest & Pacific Region Honor Award, Delta Shelter, 2007
 American Architecture Award, Chicago Athenaeum, Delta Shelter, 2007
 American Architecture Award, Chicago Athenaeum, Tye River Cabin, 2007
 AIA National Honor Award, Chicken Point Cabin, 2004
 AIA National Honor Award, The Brain, 2004
 American Architecture Award, Chicago Athenaeum, Chicken Point Cabin, 2004
 Architectural League of New York, Emerging Architect: Tom Kundig, 2004
 AIA Northwest & Pacific Region Design Honor Award, Chicken Point Cabin, 2003

Product design
In 2012, Olson Kundig Architects launched a steel accessories line, The Tom Kundig Collection, comprising over 25 hardware pieces that celebrate the kinetic moments that occur in buildings. The Tom Kundig Collection includes cabinet pulls, rollers, door knockers and knobs. Kundig collaborated with Seattle-based fabricator 12th Avenue Iron to manufacture the line.
 
The architect explains in an interview in Dwell magazine, that the “simplest-looking pieces” (the Peel, Ear and Droop Ear cabinet pulls) are also the most rewarding—“they represent the collection at its most elemental.” He calls the higher-priced Roll and Disc rollers a “wink and a nod” to their complex fabrication. Their edited forms are, as Kundig says, “honest about how they are made and what they are made from.”
 
According to Kundig, this line is the very first of many; now that he has begun to focus in this direction, he wants to keep going. “There are so many other products that I can’t find in the commodity market. Designing them myself and putting them out there for others to use seems like the right evolution.” The Tom Kundig Collection won a 2012 “Best of Year” award in the hardware category from Interior Design Magazine.
 
In 2013, Kundig designed The Final Turn, a funerary urn, with Greg Lundgren, owner of Lundgren Monuments in Seattle. The urn consists of two halves of an eight- inch-diameter blackened steel or bronze sphere—the halves are threaded with a noticeable offset from one another when they meet. While the sphere implies perfection and eternity, the offset nature of the urn is inspired by the people left behind—those whose lives are thrown off-kilter by the passing of a loved one. “It’s a quiet reminder.” Kundig noted in a New York Times interview. A threaded cap atop the stem on the lower half provides access to the receptacle for the remains. The upper half includes a compartment designed to house mementos. Flat surfaces on the exterior accommodate inscriptions, if desired.

Films and videos
 Shadowboxx, 2012 – Three minute stop-motion film captures the ever-changing natural conditions of a place and the ability of a house to morph and respond to those changes over the course of a day.
 The Art Of: Tom Kundig Collection by 12th Avenue Iron, 2012 – Created and produced by Kontent Partners, The Art Of series celebrates the craft, passion, and people who make desired and sought-after objects of design. This short format vignette focuses on the Tom Kundig hardware line created and produced in partnership between 12th Avenue Iron and Olson Kundig Architects.
 An Interview with Jim Olson and Tom Kundig, 2012 – Created for the 28th Annual Interior Design Magazine Hall of Fame Award, this video introduces the work of Jim Olson and Tom Kundig. Video produced by C & M City Inc.
 Between Light and Shadow, 2011 – Discussion between Tom Kundig, Carol Bobo and Amber Murray about two houses that Kundig created for Bobo: Studio House in Shoreline, Seattle, and Shadowboxx in Lopez Island.
 Art Stable Time Lapse, 2011 – Art Stable is an urban infill project in the rapidly developing South Lake Union neighborhood of Seattle. Built on the site of a former horse stable, the seven-story mixed-use building carries its working history into the future with highly adaptable live/work units.
 Tom Kundig: Prototypes and Moving Parts, 2010 – A collection of projects by Tom Kundig.
 Moving Mazama, 2013 - Short by Katie Turinski depicting the differing viewpoints behind the Flagg Mountain controversy.

Flagg Mountain hut legal dispute
In 2012, Tom Kundig and Jim Dow built a cabin on top of Flagg Mountain in Mazama, Washington that has been opposed by a coalition including a number of area residents and adjoining property owners, who claim that the building, which is cantilevered over a rock cliff, is visually obtrusive and breaks an unwritten agreement among residents not to build atop the ridgeline. Those opponents have filed a lawsuit claiming that the structure violates protective viewshed covenants that were placed on the property by earlier owners. The cabin's owners (including Kundig and Dow) assert that the cabin's location is legal, that it is not as visible as opponents claim, that placement elsewhere would have intruded on other neighbors, and that once its exterior siding is completed, it will blend in more with its surroundings. The case is being heard in Superior Court of Okanogan County, Washington.

Notable works
 Vergelegen, Berkshire Residence, The Berkshires, Massachusetts, 2015
Sawmill, Tehachapi, California, 2014
Studhorse, Winthrop, Washington, 2012
Charles Smith Wines Tasting Room and World Headquarters, Walla Walla, Washington, 2011
The Pierre, San Juan Islands, Washington, 2010
Art Stable, Seattle, Washington, 2010
Slaughterhouse Beach House, Maui, Hawaii, 2010
Studio Sitges, Sitges, Spain, 2010
Shadowboxx, San Juan Islands, Washington, 2010
Outpost, Central Idaho, 2007
Montecito Residence, Montecito, California, 2007
Rolling Huts, Mazama, Washington, 2007
Delta Shelter, Mazama, Washington, 2005
Chicken Point Cabin, Northern Idaho, 2002
The Brain, Seattle, Washington, 2001
Ridge House, Eastern Washington, 2001
Mission Hill Winery, Westbank, British Columbia, 2000
Studio House, Seattle, Washington, 1998

Publications
 Tom Kundig: Working Title, Princeton Architectural Press, 2020.
 Tom Kundig: Works, Princeton Architectural Press, 2015.
 Tom Kundig: Houses 2. Princeton Architectural Press, 2011.   
Ngo, Dung. Tom Kundig: Houses. Princeton Architectural Press, 2006.        
Ojeda, Oscar Riera, ed. Olson Sundberg Kundig Allen Architects: Architecture, Art, and Craft. The Monacelli Press, 2001.

References

External references
 Olson Kundig Architects website
 Cooper Hewitt National Design Awards
 E-Architect listing for Tom Kundig
 2008 AIA Honor Awards Press Release
 Architectural Digest, AD 100

Living people
20th-century American architects
Architects from Washington (state)
Architects from Seattle
Fellows of the American Institute of Architects
1954 births
University of Washington College of Built Environments alumni
21st-century American architects